Keeler is a large lunar impact crater that lies on the Moon's far side. It is connected along the eastern edge to Heaviside, a walled plain of similar dimensions. Keeler, however, is the younger of the two formations, with more clearly delineated features. To the northeast of Keeler is the smaller crater Stratton, and to the northwest lies Ventris.

The outer rim of Keeler is roughly circular, with a straight segment where it is joined to Heaviside. The northern portion of the rim is more irregular, with an outward protuberance to the north-northwest. Portions of the inner wall have a terrace structure, especially along the southern half. Note the terraced walls of the crater. Within the crater interior, Planté lies on the eastern floor, adjacent to the inner wall. There is an interior ridge that runs from about the midpoint toward the west-southwest. The floor is generally level, with some areas of irregularity to the south. A few small and tiny craterlets mark the interior plain.

Measurements with the electron reflectometer instrument on board the Lunar Prospector showed that this crater is one of a number of impact sites that show demagnetization. The low magnetic reading lies at the center of this crater, and the reduced field extends outward to about one and a half crater diameters. Scientists believe that shock demagnetization is the cause.

Prior to naming, Keeler was called Crater 302 by the IAU.

Satellite craters

By convention these features are identified on lunar maps by placing the letter on the side of the crater midpoint that is closest to Keeler.

References

Other sources

External links
 LTO-85C1 Plante — L&PI topographic map of crater interior.

Impact craters on the Moon